Waiwera is a small town in the north of the Auckland Region in New Zealand. Waiwera is 6 km north of Orewa, 6 km south-east of Puhoi, 23 km south-east of Warkworth and approximately 35 km from the Auckland City centre. The settlement lies at the outlet of a river also called Waiwera. Less than 1 kilometre north of the Waiwera turn-off lies the turn-off to Wenderholm Regional Park which is situated on the far side of the headland to the north of the Waiwera River outlet.

History

The name is of Māori origin and means "Hot Water" (Wai = Water and Wera = Hot), and is a shortened version of the traditional name Waiwerawera.

Its main claim to fame was the hot water springs which were well known in pre-European times and reputedly visited by Māori from as far away as Thames. The first European settler to promote the springs was Robert Graham who established a health resort in 1848. During the late 19th century there was a regular steam ferry service from Auckland. The commercial hot pools closed in 2018.

Demographics
Waiwera is part of the larger Wainui-Waiwera statistical area.

Waiwera had a population of 240 at the 2018 New Zealand census, an increase of 3 people (1.3%) since the 2013 census, and an increase of 48 people (25.0%) since the 2006 census. There were 150 households, comprising 123 males and 120 females, giving a sex ratio of 1.02 males per female. The median age was 54.8 years (compared with 37.4 years nationally), with 21 people (8.8%) aged under 15 years, 21 (8.8%) aged 15 to 29, 126 (52.5%) aged 30 to 64, and 72 (30.0%) aged 65 or older.

Ethnicities were 86.2% European/Pākehā, 8.8% Māori, 1.2% Pacific peoples, 6.2% Asian, and 3.8% other ethnicities. People may identify with more than one ethnicity.

Although some people chose not to answer the census's question about religious affiliation, 42.5% had no religion, 35.0% were Christian, 1.2% had Māori religious beliefs, 1.2% were Hindu, 2.5% were Muslim, 1.2% were Buddhist and 6.2% had other religions.

Of those at least 15 years old, 48 (21.9%) people had a bachelor's or higher degree, and 27 (12.3%) people had no formal qualifications. The median income was $30,100, compared with $31,800 nationally. 33 people (15.1%) earned over $70,000 compared to 17.2% nationally. The employment status of those at least 15 was that 90 (41.1%) people were employed full-time, 30 (13.7%) were part-time, and 9 (4.1%) were unemployed.

References 

Populated places in the Auckland Region
Beaches of the Auckland Region
Spa towns in New Zealand
Landforms of the Auckland Region
Hibiscus Coast